"22 Steps" is a song covered by Australian singer-songwriter Damien Leith and was the first single from his first studio album Where We Land. The song was released on Australian radios on 22 June 2006, with a physical release on 21 July. The Australian release includes two B-Sides, "Song for Jarvis" and "Who You Are". A bonus track, "I Still Miss Us", is available only at the Australian iTunes Store.

The song was originally released by Canadian singer-songwriter Andy Stochansky in the album Five Star Motel.

Track listing
Australian CD single
"22 Steps" – 3:34
"Song for Jarvis" – 3:21
"Who You Are" – 3:35
"I Still Miss Us" (iTunes bonus track) – 4:18

Charts

See also
List of Australian Idol commercial releases
Night of My Life

External links
22 Steps video clip

References

2007 singles
Songs written by Andy Stochansky
Songs written by Ian LeFeuvre
2007 songs
Sony BMG singles